Goto Muñiz (c. 900–c. 964) was queen consort of the Kingdom of Galicia

She married Sancho Ordóñez, King of Galicia, before 927.

After his death, she retired to a convent.

Galician queens consort
900 births
960s deaths
Year of birth uncertain
Year of death uncertain